The Bellinger–Dutton House is a historic house located at 158 River Street in Middleburgh, Schoharie County, New York.

Description and history 
It is a two-story, heavy timber-framed structure built in 1846 in the temple front Greek Revival style. It features a hipped roof and a massive Classical portico with four fluted Doric order columns. Also on the property are a frame carriage barn, garden house/playhouse, and square brick smokehouse.

It was listed on the National Register of Historic Places on December 7, 2005.

References

Houses on the National Register of Historic Places in New York (state)
Greek Revival houses in New York (state)
Houses completed in 1846
Houses in Schoharie County, New York
National Register of Historic Places in Schoharie County, New York